Belvedere College S.J. (sometimes St Francis Xavier's College) is a voluntary secondary school for boys in Dublin, Ireland. The school has numerous notable alumni in the arts, politics, sports, science, and business. Alumni and teachers at Belvedere played major roles in modern Irish literature (James Joyce, Austin Clarke, the foundation of Ireland's National Theatre), the standardisation of the Irish language (de Bhaldraithe), as well as the Irish independence movement – both the 1916 Rising (Joseph Mary Plunkett, Éamon de Valera) and the Irish War of Independence (Éamon de Valera, Cathal Brugha, Kevin Barry). The school's notable alumni and former faculty include two Taoisigh (Irish Prime Minister), one Ceann Comhairle (Speaker of the Lower House of the Irish Parliament), several cabinet ministers, one Blessed, one Cardinal, one Archbishop, one signatory of the Proclamation of the Irish Republic, two Supreme Court Justices, one Olympic medallist, thirty Irish international rugby players and numerous notable figures in the world of the arts, academia and business. Belvedere College forms the setting for part of James Joyce's semi-autobiographical novel A Portrait of the Artist as a Young Man'

History

Belvedere owes its origins to the efforts of John Austin who opened primary and secondary schools off Fishamble Street in 1750. The Society of Jesus has been active in the area around Hardwicke Street since 1790. They founded St Francis Xavier's College in the disused Poor Clare convent on Hardwicke Street with nine students in 1832, three years after Catholic emancipation. In 1841, the Jesuits purchased Belvedere House on neighbouring Great Denmark Street, which gave the school its name. George Augustus Rochfort (1738–1814), who became the second Earl of Belvedere in 1774, built Belvedere House, whose interior decoration was carried out by Michael Stapleton, a leading stucco craftsman of his time.

Belvedere was caught up in the events of the 1916 Rising, when the British military opened fire at the Jesuit residence.Oliver Murphy, The cruel clouds of war : a book of the sixty-eight former pupils and teachers of Belvedere College S.J. who lost their lives in the military conflicts of the 20th century, (Dublin, 2003) The Jesuits at Belvedere and the neighbouring Gardiner Street Community helped the wounded and distributed food across the locality.

In February 2012 Chinese Politburo member and future paramount leader Xi Jinping visited the college as part of his visit to Ireland for a special reception in the O'Reilly theatre. An annual exchange with a Jesuit school in Hong Kong was the catalyst for this visit.

School museum
A school museum and archive were opened in 2002 by former teacher Oliver Murphy, dedicated to the history of the institution and its past pupils.

Education
Belvedere offers the Irish Junior Certificate and Leaving Certificate curricula.

Classics

The school still offers Latin as both a Junior and Leaving Certificate subject and offers Ancient Greek as a Junior and Leaving Certificate subject when there is sufficient demand. Classical Studies is also offered at Leaving Certificate level.

Science
Garret A. FitzGerald, an Old Belvederian and senior faculty member at the University of Pennsylvania, has instituted an annual five-week scholarship for two students who excel in Transition Year science.

Facilities
Belvedere has a 25m 5 lane indoor swimming pool, gym, restaurant and refectory, music suite, learning resource centre, museum, chapel and oratory, 3 hard tennis courts (Cabra Sports Ground), 1 astroturf (Distillery Road) and 5 grass rugby pitches (Cabra Sports Ground), a cricket pitch (Cabra Sports Ground), 1 grass soccer pitch (Cabra Sports Ground), 1 astro 7-a-side football pitch on top of the O'Reilly Theatre and a 60m 8 lane roof-top running track (Kerr Wing). The school also has a professional standard 590-seat theatre with a motorised stage and retractable seating, the O'Reilly Theatre, which is used to stage school plays and musicals but has also been used by RTÉ, TV3 and an assortment of dramatic organisations and hosted live audience TV shows such as The Panel and Tonight with Vincent Browne.

The school also has three computer labs, cabled and wireless networking to every classroom, and other IT features including dedicated networks for the library and certain functions.

In 2004, Belvedere opened the Dargan Moloney Science and Technology Block, which has state-of-the-art laboratories, lecture theatres and IT hubs.

Charitable activities
The school has a wide range of charitable activities. Some students travel with the annual Dublin Diocesan, Meath Diocesan and Oblate Pilgrimages to Lourdes, France, to assist the elderly and the disabled. Belvedere's St Vincent de Paul Society is one of the largest among secondary schools in Ireland, organising activities such as old-folks events and a weekly soup run in inner city Dublin. Beginning in 1981, some students have undertaken a charity walk from Dublin to Galway each summer to raise funds for Irish Guide Dogs for the Blind, St Francis Hospice, and The Temple Street Children's University Hospital, located very near the school. The "block-pull", as it is known, has raised over €70,000 in a single event.

An annual charitable fundraising event held by the college is the "Belvedere Sleep-Out", which takes place from 22 to 24 December each year. Students "go homeless" on Dublin's O'Connell Street for three days and two nights. The Sleep-Out is run primarily by students from the college, with the assistance of a number of teachers and past pupils, to raise funds for Focus Ireland, The Home Again Society, and Father Peter McVerry's Society for homeless boys. The students fast for 24 hours during the Sleep-Out. The culmination is Christmas Eve midnight mass in the college chapel. In 2015, the event raised over €189,000 over the Christmas period for the charities. This record was broken in 2016, when the event raised €225,021 for the charities.

Sports
Belvedere has the most Royal College of Science Cup (Overall best school in track and field) wins at the Irish Schools Athletics Championships. Belvedere won 15 consecutive Royal College of Science Cup awards between 1999 and 2014.

Field sports are a traditional strength of the school. In October 2013 Belvedere held the all-Ireland schools senior track and field trophy, having won the title in the previous seven years. It also held numerous other titles at provincial levels.

Belvedere has won 35 Leinster Senior Cricket Schools Cup titles, as of 2016.

Belvedere, sometimes known as Belvo, has a strong rugby union football tradition, being one of the traditional "Big Three", along with Blackrock College and Terenure College. In 2005, for the first time in the school's history, it won both the Leinster Junior Cup and the Leinster Schools Senior Cup. In 2016 Belvedere, with eleven titles, stood second in the Leinster Senior Cup roll of honour, behind Blackrock College (68). A further success came on 17 March 2017, when Belvedere beat Blackrock College 10–3 at the RDS.

Drama
Drama productions form an integral part of Belvedere's year. Each academic year, there are four performances: a Junior Musical, a Senior Musical, a Drama Society production, and a First Year Play. Productions have included Les Misérables (school edition) in 2004, and the stage adaptation of Philip Pullman's His Dark Materials in 2007. Other productions of note include Bugsy Malone, The Adventures of Roderick Random, David Copperfield, Aladdin, Jesus Christ Superstar, A Funny Thing Happened on the Way to the Forum, The Wind in the Willows, Prince Caspian and The Voyage of the Dawn Treader, Treasure Island, The Lord of the Rings, Joseph and the Amazing Technicolor Dreamcoat, The Addams Family, West Side Storyand The Pirates of Penzance.

In 2016, an original play entitled Children of the Rising was staged at the school. The play was written by a member of staff and was nominated for a Bord Gáis Energy Student Theatre Award for Best Overall Play. The play was based on the book Children of The Rising by Joe Duffy.

Other activities
The school has debating societies in the English, Irish, Spanish, German, and French languages. Belvedere has won the all-Ireland schools debating competition (2005 among other years), the Denny Leinster Schools Senior Debating Championship in 2010, the L&H society Leinster Junior debating competition, and also the Alliance Française debating championship and Leinster Irish debating final.

Belvedere was successful in the last series of Blackboard Jungle, a popular television programme on RTÉ.

The school's longstanding Concert Choir hosts the Annual Christmas Carol Service in December, and the Annual Musical Evening in May. The choir have undertaken recordings in RTÉ, and has been successful at both the Feis Ceoil and the Wesley Feis. The college orchestra has won events at both the Wesley Feis and the Feis Ceoil.

The school has an active urban farm, growing vegetables and housing bees. The farm won the Global High Schools Europe Category at the Zayed Future Energy Prize in 2017.

Culture of Belvedere

Belvedere College is run by the Jesuit order. Most of the school's teaching staff are lay-persons, although a number of Jesuit priests and brothers assist with administration and chaplaincy.

The school motto is Per Vias Rectas – "By Straight Paths" – and the college aspires to produce "Men for Others". Students often write "AMDG" for Ad maiorem Dei gloriam, "For the greater glory of God", the motto of the Society of Jesus, on the top left of pages of their copybooks. They formerly also wrote "LDSetBVM" or Laus Deo Semper et Beatae Virgini Mariae ("Praise to God forever and to the Blessed Virgin Mary") on the bottom right of the same page.

The students are assigned to one of six lines or houses, mainly named after Jesuits who were either famous or had an association with Belvedere: Loyola, Xavier, Aylmer, Kenney, Finlay and Scully (previously named Dempsey after George Dempsey). Years are named after the progression in the Jesuit Ratio Studiorum: Elements, Rudiments, Grammar, Syntax, Poetry, and Rhetoric. Each form except Rhetoric has a captain and vice-captain.

The school's yearbook is The Belvederian. The term "Belvederian" is also sometimes used to refer to current students and "Old Belvederian" (OB) for alumni. Old Belvederians normally refer to their graduation by using "OB" followed by their final year in the college, for example, "OB 1984".

Belvedere College is the backdrop for some of James Joyce's novel A Portrait of the Artist as a Young Man. It is a semi-autobiographical piece of work and the teacher, Mr Tate, was based on Joyce's own English teacher, George Dempsey. In the book Joyce mentions his involvement in the College Opera which continues today.See also the contribution entitled "Heresy in his Essay" in Portraits: Belvedere College Dublin 1832-1982, pub. Gill & MacMillan, 1982, Ed. John Bowman & Ronan O'Donoghue In 1884, James Aloysius Cullen was appointed spiritual father at Belvedere, a position he retained for twenty years while also engaged in other ministry. Cullen was founder and director of the Sodality of Our Lady at the college, which duties included counselling students. In 1896, James Joyce was elected Student Prefect of the Society. According to Neil R. Davison, the sermons in Chapter III of A Portrait of the Artist are modeled on those given by Cullen during a retreat held in 1897.

Notable past pupils

The arts
 Thomas Bodkin – Director of the National Gallery of Ireland (1927–35)
 Francis Browne – photographer
 Austin Clarke – poet
 Harry Clarke – artist
 Tim Pat Coogan – historian and journalist
 Denis Devlin – poet
 Owen Dudley Edwards – historian and literary expert on Oscar Wilde, Arthur Conan Doyle and P.G. Wodehouse
 Patrick Duggan – actor
 William Fay – co-founder of the Abbey Theatre
 Jimmy Glover – composer 
 Mark Greaney and Fergal Matthews – members of indie rock band JJ72
 James Joyce – writer
 Donagh MacDonagh – poet, playwright, broadcaster, folklorist, and district justice
 Hugh Maguire – violinist
 John O'Conor – pianist and Beethoven master
 Jimmy O'Dea – actor
 Liam O'Flaherty – writer
 Conal O'Riordan – writer
 Jack Reynor- actor
 Eoin Macken - model and actor
 Rejjie Snow – rapper
 Mervyn Wall – writer
 Leo Whelan - painter

Irish history, politics
 Kevin Barry – Irish republican (did not graduate)
 Cathal Brugha – Irish republican (did not graduate)
 Richard Bruton – Fine Gael Teachta Dála (TD) Deputy Leader of Fine Gael & Government Minister
 Jack Chambers – Fianna Fáil Teachta Dála (TD)
 Garret FitzGerald – Fine Gael Taoiseach former Leader of Fine Gael
 Brothers Brian Lenihan and Conor Lenihan – Fianna Fáil Teachtaí Dála (TD)
 William Martin Murphy – Member of Parliament (MP)
 Cian O'Callaghan - member of the Social Democrats(TD) for Dublin Bay North
 Chris O'Malley – Fine Gael Member of European Parliament (MEP), 1986–89
 Joseph Mary Plunkett – rebel; signatory of 1916 Proclamation; executed a month later
 James McNeill - Governor General of the Irish Free State

Legal
 Arthur Cox – founder of eponymous law firm and member of the Seanad
 Kevin Dixon - Attorney General of Ireland from 1942 - 1946
 William FitzGerald (Irish judge) - former Chief Justice of Ireland
 Adrian Hardiman – Supreme Court Judge
 John Hedigan – High Court Judge
 Michael Joseph Hogan - Chief Justice of the Supreme Court of Hong Kong for 14 years
 Séamus Woulfe – barrister; Attorney General of Ireland since June 2017

Irish language
 Tomás de Bhaldraithe – lexicographer
 Lambert McKenna – lexicographer, editor, educationist, and former principal of Belvedere College

Science and academia
 John Gabriel Byrne - first professor of computer science in Trinity College Dublin
 Myles Dillon – Celticist, President of the Royal Irish Academy
 Desmond Fennell - writer, cultural philosopher and linguist
 Garret A. FitzGerald – Professor of Medicine and Systems Pharmacology and Translational Therapeutics, Perelman School of Medicine, University of Pennsylvania
 Fergus O'Rourke – zoologist
 Frank Winder – biochemist, vice-president of the Royal Irish Academy
 Peter Lalor

Religion
 Cardinal Desmond Connell – Archbishop of Dublin and Primate of Ireland
 Archbishop Dermot Ryan – Archbishop of Dublin and Primate of Ireland
 Malachi Martin – priest, author
 Robert Dermot O'Flanagan – Bishop of Juneau
 Columba Marmion (1858–1923) – Abbot of the Maredsous Abbey (Belgium)

Rugby
 Ollie Campbell – rugby union
 Andrew Clinch (1867–1937) – rugby union Irish international 10 caps, President of Irish Rugby Football Union
 Thomas Crean – rugby union and military; and his nephew Cyril Patrick Crean 
 Eugene Davy – rugby union and founder of the Davy Group with his brother James
 James Downey – rugby union
 Andrew Dunne – rugby union, cricket
 James Hart - current Biarritz Olympique rugby player
 Cian Healy – rugby union
 David Hawkshaw - rugby union
 Ian Keatley – rugby union
 George J Morgan – rugby union
 Karl Mullen – rugby union
 Eoin O'Malley – rugby union
 Sir Tony O'Reilly – rugby union and business as head of Heinz and Independent News and Media and former Chairman of Waterford Wedgwood
 Hugh O'Sullivan - current Leinster Rugby player
 David Shanahan - Current Ulster Rugby player

Other sports
 Alec O'Riordan – cricketer
 Frank Miller - cricketer
 Cathal Pendred – retired mixed martial artist in the UFC and actor
 Frank Winder – rock climbing
 Paul Corry – soccer
 Kevin Grogan - soccer
 Pat Taaffe Cheltenham Gold Cup winner on the horse Arkle and Tom Taaffe - jockey and trainer
 James McGee - tennis player

Olympians
 Noel Purcell – water polo, rugby union, international rugby union referee and Olympian separately with Great Britain at Antwerp 1920 and with Ireland at Paris 1924.
 Peter Coghlan - Competed for Ireland in the Sydney 2000 Olympics in the 110 metres hurdles
 Cian O'Connor – Olympian (London 2012, Athens 2004 – equestrian)
 Barry Murphy – Olympian (London 2012 - swimming)
 Scott Flanigan - Competed in the 470 class at the London 2012 Olympic Games

Gaelic sports
 Seán Boylan – former Meath GAA football manager, international rules coach and traditional medical herbalist 
 Ger Brennan – Former Dublin and St.Vincents GAA player and member of the 2003 Senior Rugby team 1st XV
 Dr. Jack McCaffrey  – GAA, 2015 FOTY and Clontarf GAA player

Business and professional
 Garrett Kelleher – construction
 Michael Scott – architect who established Scott Tallon Walker
 Sam Stephenson – architect who established Stephenson, Gibney & Associates
 Alfred Edwin Jones – architect

Broadcasting
 John Bowman – broadcaster
 Ian Dempsey – radio DJ with Today FM (Did not graduate)
 Henry Kelly – BBC and RTE television presenter, radio disc jockey and the person on whom the character Henry Sellers in Father Ted was based
 Sir Terry Wogan – BBC and RTE broadcaster
 Anton Savage – TV and Radio Host and PR advisor

Peers
 Edward Pakenham, Lord Silchester 
 Thomas Pakenham, 8th Earl of Longford – historian

Other
 Edward Joseph Garland - Canadian Member of Parliament for Alberta and diplomat
 Arthur Beveridge - British military officer and Military Cross Holder, Norwegian War Cross holder and honorary physician to George VI
 William Russell Grace - first Roman Catholic Mayor of New York City and founder of W. R. Grace and Company

Notable faculty

 
 George Dempsey – model for Mr. Tate in Joyce's Portrait of an Artist'' and after whom a stream class "Dempsey" was named for a number of years
 Phil Conway - Former PE teacher who competed for Ireland at the 1972 Summer Olympics in Munich in the Shot Put
 Michael Morrison - photographer at the liberation of Bergen Belsen concentration camp
 Peter McVerry - homelessness campaigner in Dublin
 John Hennig - worked as a teacher for a period during the 1940s

See also
 List of Jesuit schools
 List of Jesuit sites in Ireland
 List of alumni of Jesuit educational institutions

References

External links
 Belvedere College website
 Belvedere College Past Pupils Union website

Boys' schools in the Republic of Ireland
Secondary schools in Dublin (city)
Private schools in the Republic of Ireland
Jesuit secondary schools in Ireland
Educational institutions established in 1832